Venelin Khubenov (born 19 April 1959) is a Bulgarian former cyclist. He competed in the team time trial event at the 1980 Summer Olympics.

References

External links
 

1959 births
Living people
Bulgarian male cyclists
Olympic cyclists of Bulgaria
Cyclists at the 1980 Summer Olympics
Place of birth missing (living people)